"Key Largo" is a popular song recorded by Bertie Higgins in 1981. Released as a single in September of that year, it became, in early 1982, Higgins' only Top 40 hit in the United States; it peaked at #8 on the Billboard Hot 100 chart. The track spent 17 weeks in the Top 40 and was certified Gold by the RIAA. In addition, "Key Largo" topped the adult contemporary chart for two weeks. In the United Kingdom, it reached #60 on the UK Singles Chart.

Background and content
The song's lyrics plead with a lover to reconsider ending a romance the singer compares to that depicted by Humphrey Bogart and Lauren Bacall, the stars of the 1948 namesake film. The glamorous couple is recalled in the lyric We had it all / Just like Bogie and Bacall / Starring in our own late late show / Sailin' away to Key Largo. 
The lyrics also draw from the film Casablanca, in the lines "Here's looking at you, kid" and "Please say you will / Play it again". The song "Key Largo" was included on Higgins' album Just Another Day in Paradise.

In 2009, VH1 ranked "Key Largo" #75 on its program 100 Greatest One Hit Wonders of the 80s.

Music video
A promotional music video was produced in 1982, filmed in and around Tarpon Springs, Florida. It begins with Bertie Higgins leaning against a pole, smoking a cigarette, reminiscing.  Later, the singer is seen walking with a young woman, played by then-17-year-old Patty Wolfe.  The scene then cuts to the pair riding in a motorboat around Anclote Key, off Tarpon Springs. The video also shows them in a car on Fred Howard Park. The final moments depict the two walking along a beach at sunset.

Chart performance

Weekly charts

Year-end charts

Certifications and sales

See also
List of number-one adult contemporary singles of 1982 (U.S.)

References

External links
Single release info at discogs.com
Key Largo video on youtube.com

1981 debut singles
Bertie Higgins songs
Cultural depictions of Humphrey Bogart
1981 songs
Epic Records singles
1980s ballads
Key Largo